St. Vital Island is an island in Bay De Noc Township, Delta County, Michigan. The island is located in Big Bay de Noc in Lake Michigan. St. Vital Island is uninhabited and owned by the United States Forest Service. It is part of the Hiawatha National Forest. The island is home to a small colony of nesting Common terns and Black-crowned night herons.

Climate

References

Islands of Delta County, Michigan
Uninhabited islands of Michigan
Islands of Lake Michigan in Michigan